The Last King of Scotland is a 2006 historical drama film directed by Kevin Macdonald from a screenplay by Peter Morgan and Jeremy Brock. Based on Giles Foden's 1998 novel, it depicts the dictatorship of Ugandan President Idi Amin through the perspective of a fictional Scottish doctor. The film stars Forest Whitaker and James McAvoy in these respective roles, with Kerry Washington, Simon McBurney, and Gillian Anderson in supporting roles. The title of the film refers to Amin's claim of being the King of Scotland.

A British and German co-production, the film was released in the United States on 27 September 2006 and in the United Kingdom on 12 January 2007. It grossed $48.4 million on a $6 million budget and received positive reviews, with acclaim for Whitaker's performance. Whitaker won an Academy Award for Best Actor, among other accolades.

Plot
In 1970, Nicholas Garrigan graduates from medical school at the University of Edinburgh. With dull prospects at home, he decides to seek adventure abroad by working at a Ugandan missionary clinic run by Dr. David Merrit and his wife, Sarah. Garrigan becomes attracted to Sarah, who enjoys the attention but refuses to engage in an extramarital affair.

Meanwhile, General Idi Amin overthrows incumbent president Milton Obote in a coup d'état. Amin gives a well-received speech, but Sarah is  pessimistic, noting that similar enthusiasm had once been shown for Obote. Garrigan is called to a minor car accident where he treats Amin's hand. During the incident, Garrigan takes a gun and shoots a mortally wounded cow because no one else has the presence of mind to put it out of its misery. Amin is impressed by his quick action and initiative. Fond of Scotland as a symbol of resilience and admiring of the Scottish people for their resistance to the English, Amin is delighted to discover Garrigan's nationality and exchanges his military shirt for Garrigan's Scotland shirt. Later, Amin invites Garrigan to become his personal physician and take charge of modernising the country's healthcare system.

Garrigan soon becomes Amin's trusted confidant and is relied on for much more than medical care, such as matters of state. Although Garrigan is aware of violence around Kampala, he accepts Amin's explanation that cracking down on the opposition will bring lasting peace to the country. Garrigan later learns that Amin has ostracized the youngest of his three wives, Kay, because she has given birth to an epileptic son, Mackenzie. When treating Mackenzie, Garrigan and Kay start to form a relationship.

Eventually, Garrigan begins to lose faith in Amin as he witnesses the increasing paranoia, murders, and xenophobia. He attempts to tell Amin's of his intention to return home, but is rejected saying that he still has work to do. While at a party, he and Kay have sex, with Kay telling him he must find a way to leave Uganda. Amin replaces Garrigan's British passport with a Ugandan one to prevent him from escaping, which leads Garrigan to frantically seek help from Stone, the local British Foreign Office representative. Garrigan is told the British will help him leave Uganda if he uses his position to assassinate Amin, but Garrigan refuses.

In 1972, Amin orders the expulsion of Asians from Uganda over the protest of Garrigan. This creates a labor shortage that dive-bombs Uganda's economy. Kay informs Garrigan that she has become pregnant with his child. Aware that Amin will murder her for infidelity if he discovers this, she begs Garrigan for a secret abortion. Delayed by Amin's command that he attend a press conference with Western journalists, Garrigan fails to meet Kay at the appointed time. She concludes she has been abandoned and seeks out a primitive abortion in a nearby village, where she is apprehended by Amin's forces. Garrigan finds her dismembered corpse on an autopsy table and falls retching to his knees, finally confronting the inhumanity of Amin's regime, and decides killing him will end it all.

A hijacked aircraft is flown to Entebbe Airport by pro-Palestinian hijackers seeking asylum. Amin, sensing a major publicity opportunity, rushes to the scene, taking Garrigan along. At the airport, one of Amin's bodyguards discovers Garrigan's plot to poison Amin under the ruse of giving him pills for a headache. Garrigan is beaten by Amin's henchmen before Amin arrives and discloses he is aware of the relationship with Kay. As punishment, Garrigan's chest is pierced with meat hooks before he is hanged by his skin.

Amin arranges a plane for the release of non-Israeli passengers, and the torturers leave Garrigan unconscious on the floor while they relax in another room. Garrigan's medical colleague, Dr. Junju, takes advantage of the opportunity to rescue him. He urges Garrigan to tell the world the truth about Amin's regime, asserting that the world will believe Garrigan because he is white. Junju gives Garrigan his own jacket, enabling him to mingle unnoticed with the crowd of freed hostages and board the plane. When the torturers discover Garrigan's absence, Junju is killed for aiding in the escape. While Amin is being informed of Garrigan's escape, which he is too late to prevent, Garrigan boards the plane and tearfully remembers the people of Uganda.

An epilogue reveals that the Entebbe incident irreparably ruined Amin's reputation in the international community and in 1979 he made a foolhardy decision to invade Tanzania, which promptly counterattacked and captured Kampala, overthrowing him. He lived the rest of his life in exile in Saudi Arabia until his death in 2003.

Cast

 Forest Whitaker as Idi Amin
 James McAvoy as Dr. Nicholas Garrigan
 Kerry Washington as Kay Amin
 Gillian Anderson as Sarah Merrit
 Simon McBurney as Stone
 David Oyelowo as Dr. Junju
 Stephen Rwangyezi as Jonah Wasswa
 Abby Mukiibi Nkaaga as Masanga
 Adam Kotz as David Merrit
 David Ashton as Garrigan Sr.
 Barbara Rafferty as Mrs. Garrigan
 Sam Okelo as Bonny
 Sarah Nagayi as Tolu
 Chris Wilson as Perkins
 Apollo Okwenje Omamo as Mackenzie Amin
 Louis Asea as Campbell Amin
 Joanitta Bewulira-Wandera as Malyamu Amin
 Consodyne Buzabo as Nora Amin
 Shabir Mir as Zumba
 Cleopatra Koheirwe as Joy
 Michael Wawuyo as Andrew Mukooza
 Martina Amati as Italian Journalist
 Angela Kalule as Nightclub singer

Historical accuracy 
While the character of Idi Amin and some of the events surrounding him in the film are mostly based on fact, Garrigan is a fictional character. Foden has acknowledged that one real-life figure who contributed to the character Garrigan was English-born Bob Astles, who worked with Amin. Another real-life figure who has been mentioned in connection with Garrigan is Scottish doctor Wilson Carswell. Like the novel on which it is based, the film mixes fiction with real events to give an impression of Amin and Uganda under his rule. While the basic arc of Amin's rule is followed, the events in the film depart from both actual history and the plot and characters in Foden's novel.

In real life and in the book, Kay Amin was impregnated by her lover, who was a Ugandan physician (given a different name in the book than in real life). She died during a botched abortion performed by him, and he subsequently committed suicide.  Astles said in a lengthy interview for The Times with the journalist Paul Vallely that her body was dismembered by her lover so it could be hidden and was then sewn back together on Amin's orders. Amin never had a son named Campbell.

Contrary to the wording of the film's coda stating, "48 hours later, Israeli Forces stormed Entebbe and liberated all but one of the hostages", three hostages died during Operation Entebbe. The body of a fourth hostage, 75-year-old Dora Bloch, who was killed by Uganda Army officers at a nearby hospital in retaliation for Israel's actions, was eventually returned to Israel. The murder of Dora Bloch is depicted accurately in the book but not mentioned at all in the film.  Also when the non-Israeli hostages were released, they are seen being flown out of Entebbe, Uganda to Paris, France on an Antonov An-12 aircraft, but in real life the non-Israeli hostages were flown to Paris on a chartered Air France Boeing 747.

According to Foden, the film's depiction of Amin is comparable with the Shakespearean character Macbeth, whom he had in mind when writing the novel.

Release
The Last King of Scotland received a limited release in the United States on 27 September 2006, a UK release on 12 January 2007, a French release on 14 February 2007, and a German release on 15 March 2007. In the United States and Canada, the film earned $17,606,684 at the box office. In the United Kingdom, the film took $11,131,918. Its combined worldwide gross was $48,362,207.

Reception

Critical response
The Last King of Scotland has an approval rating of 87% on Rotten Tomatoes, based on 185 reviews, with an average score of 7.3/10. The website's critical consensus states: "Forest Whitaker's performance as real-life megalomaniac dictator Idi Amin powers this fictionalized political thriller, a blunt and brutal tale about power and corruption". At Metacritic, the film has a score of 74 out of 100 based on 36 critics, indicating "generally favorable reviews".

Accolades
Whitaker won in the leading actor category at the Academy Awards, the British Academy Film Awards, the Critics' Choice Movie Awards, the Golden Globe Awards, and the Screen Actors Guild Awards. Whitaker also won awards from the Boston Society of Film Critics, the Los Angeles Film Critics' Association, the National Board of Review, the National Society of Film Critics, the New York Film Critics' Circle, the Washington D.C. Area Film Critics Association, and many other critics awards, for a total of at least 23 major awards, with at least one more nominations. 

As of 2022, Whitaker from The Last King of Scotland and Helen Mirren from The Queen are the only two lead performances for portraying real-life leaders, and is the only lead actor to ever sweep the rarest achievements known as "The Big Four" critics awards (LAFCA, NBR, NYFCC, NSFC) as well as win the Oscar, BAFTA, Critics' Choice, Golden Globe, and SAG awards in the same year.

The film was received well in Uganda, where it premiered two days before Whitaker won the Academy Award.

Notes

References

External links
 

2006 films
2006 drama films
British drama films
English-language German films
German drama films
DNA Films films
Film4 Productions films
BAFTA winners (films)
Best British Film BAFTA Award winners
Cultural depictions of Idi Amin
Swahili-language films
Films about dictators
Films about terrorism in Africa
Films based on British novels
Films directed by Kevin Macdonald (director)
Films featuring a Best Actor Academy Award-winning performance
Films featuring a Best Drama Actor Golden Globe winning performance
Films scored by Alex Heffes
Films set in 1970
Films set in 1976
Films set in Scotland
Films set in Uganda
Films set in airports
Films shot in Uganda
Films whose writer won the Best Adapted Screenplay BAFTA Award
Operation Entebbe
Films with screenplays by Peter Morgan
Films about coups d'état
Fox Searchlight Pictures films
2000s British films
2000s German films